Hydrophis klossi, commonly known as Kloss's sea snake or Kloss' sea snake, is a species of sea snake in the family Elapidae. Like all other sea snakes, it is venomous. The species is endemic to the Indian Ocean.

Geographic range
H. klossi is found in the Indian Ocean in Cambodia, Indonesia (Sumatra), Peninsular Malaysia, Thailand (including Phuket), and Vietnam.

Description
The body of H. klossi is olive dorsally and yellowish ventrally, with black rings, which are wider than the interspaces on the dorsum, but narrower on the venter. Head black with yellowish spots.

The type specimen is 90 cm (35 inches) in total length, which includes a tail 7.5 cm (3 inches) long.

The dorsal scales are  imbricate (overlapping), smooth on the anterior part of the body, keeled on the posterior part, and arranged in 33 rows around the thickest part of the body (in 25 rows around the neck). The ventrals number 360.

The head is small, and the body is very slender anteriorly. The diameter of the eye is slightly less than its distance from the mouth. The rostral is slightly broader than deep. The frontal is very small, as long as broad, less than half as large as the supraocular. There is one anterior temporal. There are five upper labials, the fourth (or third and fourth) entering the eye. There are two pairs of chin shields, which are in contact with each other. The ventrals are only slightly larger than the contiguous scales.

Etymology
H. klossi is named after Cecil Boden Kloss (1877–1949), director of the Raffles Museum in Singapore from 1923 to 1932.

References

Further reading
Boulenger GA (1912). A Vertebrate Fauna of the Malay Peninsula from the Isthmus of Kra to Singapore including the Adjacent Islands. Reptilia and Batrachia. London: Government of the Federated Malay States. (Taylor and Francis, printers). xiii + 298 pp. (Hydrophis klossi, new species, p. 190).
Kharin VE (2004). ["A review of sea snakes of the genus Hydrophis sensu stricto (Serpentes, Hydrophiidae)"]. [Biologiya Morya] (Vladivostok) 30 (6): 447–454. (in Russian).
Smith MA (1943). The Fauna of British India, Ceylon and Burma, Including the Whole of the Indo-Chinese Sub-region. Reptilia and Amphibia. Vol. III.—Serpentes. London: Secretary of State for India. (Taylor and Francis, printers). xii + 583 pp. (Hydrophis klossi, pp. 457–458).

klossi
Fauna of Southeast Asia
Reptiles of Thailand
Reptiles described in 1912